Zabaykalsk is an urban locality (an urban-type settlement) and the administrative center of Zabaykalsky District of Zabaykalsky Krai, Russia, located on the Sino-Russian border just opposite the Chinese border town of  Manzhouli. Population:

Geography

Climate
Zabaikalsk has a humid continental climate (Dfb) with very warm summers and very cold winters.

History

It was founded in 1904 as a station (Razyezd 86, i.e. "Passing loop No. 86") on the Chinese Eastern Railway.

Since 1924, a border guard detachment has been stationed there. In the aftermath of the Sino-Soviet conflict (1929) the station  was renamed Otpor ("Repulse").

Until the mid-1930s, Razyezd 86 / Otpor had little significance as a station, as all border formalities were done at Matsiyevskaya station (deeper into Russia) and at Manzhouli Railway Station, on the Chinese side of the border. The station was expanded in the mid-1930s, as the railway on the Chinese side had been sold by the USSR to Manchukuo  and converted from the  gauge of the Russian Railways to the  China Railway; Otpor thus became the last Russian-gauge station. The station became quite important in 1945, as one of the bases of the Soviet invasion of Manchuria, which also saw the rail line on the Chinese side temporary re-converted to Russian gauge. The station's importance continued as the main rail connection between the USSR and the Communist China. On China's request, in 1958 the Soviets changed the name "Otpor" to the neutral Zabaykalsk (i.e., "a city in Transbaikalia", or "a city beyond Lake Baikal").

Otpor Incident
Eighteen Jews fled from Europe to Otopol Station (now Zabaykalsk Station) on the Trans-Siberian Railway, located on the border between the Soviet Union and Manchuria. The Manchurian government refused to accept them for fear of worsening relations with Germany. Major General Kiichiro Higuchi, who was consulted by Abraham Kaufman, the head of the Far Eastern Jewish Association, saw the situation and together with his subordinates arranged for food, clothing, fuel to survive the cold, medical care, and a route to Shanghai for the Jews.　

This route was called the "Higuchi Route," and it is said that between 4,000 and 20,000 Jews traveled to Shanghai via this route between 1938 and 1940. Later, Sugihara Chiune and Wang Kaewo rescued Jewish refugees to the Japanese concession in Shanghai. For this achievement, Higuchi's name was listed in the sixth "Golden Book" in 1941.

Transportation

The Russo-Chinese highway AH6 passes through the town.

Zabaykalsk/Manzhouli is one of the three direct connections between Russian and Chinese Railways. The other two are in Primorsky Krai, much farther to the east; besides, much traffic between Russia and China travels on the rail line crossing Mongolia. It is served by what is now officially called the Southern Branch of the Transbaykal Railway (Южный ход Забайкальской железной дороги): a line that branches off the present-day main  Trans-Siberian Railway line at Karymskaya junction (east of Chita), and continues southeast toward the Chinese border. Originally (until 1916), this line was part of the main Moscow-to-Vladivostok rail route, where trains coming from the west would continue into China on the former Chinese Eastern Railway, in order to cut across Manchuria on their way to Russian Vladivostok. After the modern route of the Trans-Siberian Railway, located entirely within Russian national territory, was completed in 1916, the Southern Branch's role was restricted to that of servicing Russia's border communities, and providing connectivity to China.

Zabaykalsk has been  a transshipment station for a break of gauge since the 1930s, when the railway on the Chinese side had been sold by the USSR to Manchukuo  and converted from the  gauge of the Soviet Railways to the  Manchukuo National Railway.

Since 2005, a number of projects have been carried out to increase the capacity of the "Southern Branch", and its connection to China.
The goal was to enable the railway by 2010 to handle 30 trains in each direction, each one up to 71  cars long. By  2005, the maximum weight of the trains using the line had already been increased from 4,000 to  6,300 tons.

In 2008, TransContainer's container transshipment facility was expanded.
Work on modernizing the facility for passenger railcar bogie exchange was conducted as well.

Notable residents
Lidia Bobrova, film director

See also
Longest trains

References

External links

World Cargo News
Steelguru

Urban-type settlements in Zabaykalsky Krai
Populated places established in 1904
China–Russia border crossings